Vestvollen Bluff is a rock and ice bluff forming the west side of Festninga Mountain in the Muhlig-Hofmann Mountains, Queen Maud Land. It was mapped by Norwegian cartographers from surveys and air photos by the Norwegian Antarctic Expedition (1956–60) and named Vestvollen, meaning "the west wall."

Cliffs of Queen Maud Land
Princess Martha Coast